The Liberal Party of Australia (Australian Capital Territory Division), branded as Canberra Liberals, is the division of the Liberal Party of Australia in the Australian Capital Territory (ACT). The party has been in opposition in the ACT Legislative Assembly for much of its existence, but held power with the support of minor parties and independents between 1989 and 1991 and again between 1995 and 2001.

History

The first Liberal branch in Canberra was formed in order to field a candidate in the newly created Division of Australian Capital Territory at the 1949 federal election. The first meeting of the branch was held at the Albert Hall on 27 January 1949. The inaugural meeting of the Canberra women's branch was held on 29 June 1949. By 1961, there were three branches of the Liberal Party in the ACT, and a branch of the Young Liberals was created around the same time.

The party held a number of seats in the Australian Capital Territory House of Assembly throughout its existence. In the first election under self-government in 1989 the Liberal Party won four seats. The Liberals were led in the Assembly by Trevor Kaine, initially in opposition but in December 1989 the party formed a coalition known as the Alliance with the Residents Rally that lasted from December 1989 until June 1991 when a dispute over school closures broke up the coalition and returned the parties to opposition. Kaine was briefly replaced as leader by Gary Humphries, but regained the position a month later. Two years later he was replaced by Kate Carnell.

At the 1995 election the Liberals won 7 seats and Carnell formed a minority government with the support of independent members Michael Moore and Paul Osborne who would both subsequently serve as ministers. Carnell served as Chief Minister until October 2000 when she resigned in advance of a no confidence motion over the increased costs of the Canberra Stadium. She was succeeded by Humphries but the party lost power in the 2001 election. It has been in opposition ever since, having installed and removed multiple leaders such as Zed Seselja, Jeremy Hanson and Alistair Coe. The current leader of the party is Elizabeth Lee.

In the 2022 federal election, Seselja, who was the sole Canberra Liberals parliamentarian in federal parliament, lost his Senate seat to independent David Pocock. This left the Canberra Liberals with no representation in the 47th Parliament. A review into the territory division's defeat at the election would be headed by former WA Liberal leader Mike Nahan and former Victorian Liberal senator Helen Kroger. The review would include an examination of the Canberra Liberals and its electoral performance among different voter segments, and would propose strategies to regain federal representation.

Leaders

Election results

References

Liberal Party of Australia members of the Australian Capital Territory Legislative Assembly
Australian Capital Territory
Political parties in the Australian Capital Territory